"Ghostin" (stylized in all lowercase) is a song by American singer Ariana Grande from her fifth studio album Thank U, Next (2019). It was written by Grande, Victoria Monét, Tayla Parx, Savan Kotecha and its producers Max Martin and Ilya Salmanzadeh.

Commercially, the song reached number 25 on the Billboard Hot 100, after the release of her album.

Background and release

"Ghostin" was written by Ariana Grande, Victoria Monét, Tayla Parx, Savan Kotecha, and producers Max Martin and Ilya Salmanzadeh, for Grande's fifth studio album Thank U, Next (2019). Grande's vocals were recorded at Jungle City Studios in New York City. According to Grande, it was the first song written for the album and took the longest to write: "We had to take [little] breaks from 'Ghostin'. That was the first hook done and then we came back and did the verses like two weeks later... everything else we did in like an hour." She also stated that it was the hardest song to write for the album, particularly the second verse. After completing the song, Grande did not want to release it and begged her manager Scooter Braun to remove it from the album, but he convinced her to keep it.

"Ghostin" was released with the album on February 8, 2019, by Republic Records. Not comfortable enough to perform the song, Grande excluded it from the set list of her Sweetener World Tour.

Composition
Ghostin is an emotional synths and strings pop and art pop ballad. When asked what the song is about in January 2019, Grande responded: "Feeling badly for the person you're with [because] you love somebody else. Feeling badly [because] he can tell he can't compare... and how I should be ghosting him.". The song is thought to be about Grande grieving for her ex-boyfriend Mac Miller, who died from a drug overdose in September 2018, while she was with her then-fiancé Pete Davidson. In a February 2019 interview, co-writer Savan Kotecha said: "The song speaks for itself in terms of what it’s about. We were with her for a week in New York witnessing that, witnessing her feelings on that."

Critical reception
The song received unanimous and universal acclaim, with praise directed towards the emotionally honest songwriting, the production and Grande's vocal performance. Michael Cragg of The Guardian called the song an "emotional centrepiece", "gorgeous" and praised Martin's "production that seems to levitate on a pillow-soft blend of eerie backwards synths and big syrupy strings". Billboard Andrew Unterberger described the song as "the album's barest, most emotional track [...] one that, appropriately, lingers with you well after it's gone."

In May 2022, Rolling Stone named the track as the third best song of Grande's career.

Commercial performance
The song debuted on the February 23, 2019 issue of the Billboard Hot 100 at number 25 in the United States, becoming Grande's 22nd top thirty entry and one of her highest-charting non-singles on the chart to date.

Credits and personnel
Credits adapted from Tidal.

 Ariana Grande – lead vocals, songwriting, vocal production
 Victoria Monét – background vocals, songwriting, vocal production
 Tayla Parx – songwriting
 Savan Kotecha – songwriting
 Max Martin – songwriting, production, vocal production, bass, guitar, keyboards, programming
 Ilya Salmanzadeh – songwriting, production, vocal production, bass, guitar, keyboards, programming
 Serban Ghenea – mixing
 John Hanes – mixing assistant
 David Bukovinszky – cello
 Mattias Bylund – strings
 Mattias Johansson – violin
 Brendan Morawski – engineering
 Sam Holland – engineering
 Cory Bice – engineering assistant
 Jeremy Lertola – engineering assistant
 Sean Klein – engineering assistant

Charts

Certifications

References

External links
 

2019 songs
2010s ballads
Ariana Grande songs
Songs written by Ariana Grande
Songs written by Tayla Parx
Songs inspired by deaths
Songs written by Victoria Monét
Songs written by Max Martin
Songs written by Ilya Salmanzadeh